John Breton (fl. 1386) was an English politician.

He was a Member (MP) of the Parliament of England for Bodmin in 1386.

References

Year of birth missing
Year of death missing
English MPs 1386
14th-century English politicians